The 1973–74 Australian region cyclone season was the third most active tropical cyclone season in the Australian Region.

Systems

Severe Tropical Cyclone Ines

On November 17, Ines formed offshore the Top End. Moving westward, the cyclone passed north of Bathurst and Melville islands. Thereafter, Ines curved southwestward and intensified into a 130 km/h (80 mph) cyclone while nearing Troughton Island. The storm made landfall in Kimberley, Western Australia on November 19. Ines slowly weakened after moving inland and dissipated on November 24.

Tropical Cyclone Annie

Cyclone Annie developed northwest of Western Australia on November 21. By December 8, it dissipated.

Severe Tropical Cyclone Beryl

Beryl formed just south of the Lesser Sunda Islands on November 26. The cyclone strengthened, peaking with winds of 125 km/h (75 mph) on December 1. Three days later, Beryl made landfall near Carnarvon, Western Australia and quickly dissipated. Minor wind damage was reported.

Tropical Cyclone Natalie–Lottie

Cyclone Lottie struck Fiji's Southern Lau Group on December 10.  High seas caused the ship Uluilakeba to capsize killing more than 85 people.

Severe Tropical Cyclone Cecily

The next system, Cecily, developed near the Cocos Islands on December 11. Cecily moved south-southwestward and peaked with winds of 125 km/h (75 mph). On December 19, the cyclone dissipated.

Tropical Cyclone Una

Una formed southwest of Solomon Islands on December 15. It struck Queensland before dissipating on December 20.

Severe Tropical Cyclone Deidre–Delinda

Cyclone Deidre developed in the vicinity of the Cocos Islands on December 20. Moving generally west-southwestward across the Indian Ocean, it crossed the 80°E on December 25.

Tropical Cyclone Erica

Tropical Cyclone Erica brought heavy rainfall to portions of Western Australia.

Tropical Cyclone Fiona–Gwenda

Fiona-Gwenda was operationally considered two different tropical cyclones.

Tropical Cyclone Vera

On January 18, Cyclone Vera developed offshore Queensland. After moving northeastward, it then curved to the southeast. On January 20, Vera crossed 160°E and entered the South Pacific basin.

Tropical Cyclone Wanda

This cyclone existed from 24 January to 27 January 1974 and led to extensive flooding over southeast Queensland. Although this tropical cyclone was relatively weak, it dropped enormous quantities of rain on south-eastern Queensland and north-eastern New South Wales over the Australia Day (26–27 January) weekend, resulting in some of the worst flooding seen in a century. The Queensland state capital, Brisbane, fared particularly badly, with fourteen lives lost and parts of the city submerged under 2 metres of the Brisbane River. (See 1974 Brisbane flood.) In northern New South Wales, a further two fatalities were reported. The cyclone's final toll: 16 dead, over 300 injured; 56 homes destroyed, a further 1,600 submerged; 8000 people left homeless.
 The Corinda Landslip
Australian Bureau of Meteorology article: The Big Wet - January 1974
Natural Disasters in Australia

Severe Tropical Cyclone Pam

During 4 February Severe Tropical Cyclone Pam moved south-westwards into the Australian region as a Category 5 severe tropical cyclone, with peak 10-minute sustained wind speeds estimated at 205 km/h (125 mph). The system was last noted during 7 February as it moved back into the South Pacific basin.

Tropical Cyclone Yvonne

Cyclone Yvonne developed on February 8 and struck the Cape York Peninsula.

Severe Tropical Cyclone Helen

On February 28, Cyclone Helen formed offshore Western Australia. Moving generally westward, it dissipated on March 8.

Severe Tropical Cyclone Zoe

Cyclone Zoe was named and detected on 9 March 1974 when it was northeast of Brisbane. In the following days it moved steadily southward and interacted with an already-exiting trough in the easterlies to produce sustained and very heavy rainfall all along the coast from Brisbane south almost to Sydney.

Severe Tropical Cyclone Isobel

Cyclone Isobel existed over the South-East Indian Ocean from March 9 to March 17.

Severe Tropical Cyclone Jessie

Jessie developed between Indonesia and Western Australia on March 16. Moving west-southwestward, it was last noted on March 25.

Tropical Cyclone Jenny

Cyclone Jenny struck northern Western Australia.

Tropical Cyclone Alice

The final system, Cyclone Alice, existed offshore the east coast of Australia from March 21 to March 23.

See also

Atlantic hurricane seasons: 1973, 1974
Eastern Pacific hurricane seasons: 1973, 1974
Western Pacific typhoon seasons: 1973, 1974
North Indian Ocean cyclone seasons: 1973, 1974
 List of wettest tropical cyclones

References

Australian region cyclone seasons
Aust
 disasters in Australia
 disasters in Australia
 disasters in Oceania
 disasters in Oceania